Martin Howrylak (born 1974) is a Michigan politician who formerly served as a Republican member of the Michigan House of Representatives.  He represented the 41st District covering Troy and Clawson.  He was elected in 2012, succeeding Marty Knollenberg who was term-limited out of office. Previously he was a three-term city council member for Troy, Michigan. Howrylak was a member of the Libertarian Party of Michigan when elected to the Troy City Council.

Howrylak has a bachelor's degree in geological sciences and a master's in accounting, both from the University of Michigan.  He is a Roman Catholic.  Howrylak was born and raised in Troy.

References

1974 births
Politicians from Detroit
Living people
People from Troy, Michigan
Republican Party members of the Michigan House of Representatives
Ross School of Business alumni
21st-century American politicians